Louis François, better known as Francis Tourte, (8 June 1816 – 5 October 1891) was a 19th-century French composer, poet, chansonnier and playwright. He was François Tourte's grandson.

He wrote lyrics for more than 500 songs and melodies, whose music he sometimes composed, operettas libretti and theatre plays which were presented on the most important Parisian stages of the 19th century including the Théâtre des Délassements-Comiques, the Théâtre des Variétés, and the Théâtre des Bouffes-Parisiens.

Works

Poetry 
1841: Brises du matin, poems
1843: Rémi ou Croyance et martyre, short story in verse

Theatre 
1856: Une femme qui n'y est pas, vaudeville in 1 act 
1859: Le Docteur Tam-Tam, opérette-bouffe in 1 act, music by Frédéric Barbier
1861: La Tour de Bondy, folie musicale in 1 act, music by Deblond
1861: Si Pontoise le savait !, comédie-vaudeville in 1 act with Paul-Aimé Chapelle and Jules Adenis
1863: Madame Pygmalion, opérette-bouffe in 1 act, with Jules Adenis, music by Frédéric Barbier
1867: Un bureau de nourrices, folie musicale in 1 act, music by Georges Douay
1867: L'Héritage du postillon, operetta in 1 act, with Amédée de Jallais, music by Auguste L'Eveillé
1867: Un cœur d'artiste, comedy in 3 acts mingled with song
1868: Mlle Marguerite s. v. p., operetta in 4 acts, with Jules Adenis, music by Théodore Lajarte
1872: Le Pommier des amours, operetta in 1 act, music by Georges Douay
1873: L'Huissier mélomane, operetta in 1 act, music by Albert Barlatier
1873: Le Banquier de ma femme, comedy in 1 act
1874: On demande une bonne qui boite, operetta in 1 act, music by Sailly
1875: Le Meunier, son fils et... l'autre, opéra comique in 1 act, music by Émile Ettling
1875: Les Valets modèles, operetta in 1 act, music by Georges Douay
1876: La Chasse aux rivaux, operetta in 1 act, music by Jules d'Aoust
1888: Le Chapitre des renseignements, comedy in 1 act
1897: Un mariage d'autrefois, opéra comique in 1 act, music by Georges Douay, posthumous

Melodies 
 Azzo le condottiere, music by Gustave Roger
 La Chanson du pressoir, lyrics and music
 Comme on s'aime à Falaise, lyrics and music
 Dans la main de Dieu !, lyrics and music
 Dormez, petit cœur, music by Théodore Ritter
 La Face et le revers, lyrics and music
 Grand'père et Petits-Enfants, music by H. Damoreau-Cinti
 Là-bas sous cette étoile, lyrics et music
 Le Mendiant d'Espagne, music by N. Martyns
 La Meunière du châtelain, music by Victor Massé
 La Révolte des noirs, music by Frédéric Barbier
 Le Roi David, music by Frédéric Barbier
 Toinon, music by Frédéric Barbier
 Tout ça c'est à moi, music by Frédéric Barbier
 Le Vin du purgatoire, lyrics and music
 Album de 10 mélodies pour voix et piano, with Charles Delange and Xavier Eyma, 1849
 Bouquet de bruyères, ballades et chansonnettes, music by several composers, 1858
 Romances, chansons et chansonnettes, music by several composers, 1863
 Almanach de la chansonnette, music by Georges Douay, 1875

External links 
 Francis Tourte on Data.bnf.fr
 Francis Tourte sur artlyriquefr

19th-century French dramatists and playwrights
French composers
19th-century French poets
French chansonniers
1816 births
Artists from Paris
1891 deaths
French male poets
19th-century French male writers